This is a summary of mass communications media in Tulsa, Oklahoma.

Radio
Tulsa is the 65th largest radio market in the country.  The following is a partial list of radio stations serving the Tulsa area.

FM radio

AM radio

Television
Tulsa is the 59th largest TV market in the United States (as ranked by Nielsen and Arbitron).

Newspapers

Tulsa's leading newspaper is the daily Tulsa World, the second most widely circulated newspaper in Oklahoma (after The Oklahoman) with a 2006 Sunday circulation of 189,789. Urban Tulsa, another large publication, is a weekly newspaper covering entertainment and cultural events. Covering primarily economic events and stocks, the Tulsa Business Journal caters to Tulsa's business sector. Other publications include the Oklahoma Indian Times, the Tulsa Daily Commerce and Legal News, the Tulsa Beacon, This Land Press, and the Tulsa Free Press. Until 1992, the Tulsa Tribune served as a daily major newspaper competing with the Tulsa World. The paper was acquired by the Tulsa World that year.

Cinema
Feature films shot in the Tulsa region include the Francis Ford Coppola productions The Outsiders and Rumble Fish (both released in 1983), as well as "Weird Al" Yankovic's UHF (1989), Tulsa (1949), All-American Murder (1992), The Frighteners (1996), Phenomenon (1996), Keys to Tulsa (1997), and Tim Blake Nelson's Eye of God (1997).

See also
 Oklahoma media
 List of newspapers in Oklahoma
 List of radio stations in Oklahoma
 List of television stations in Oklahoma
 Media of locales in Oklahoma: Broken Arrow, Lawton, Norman, Oklahoma City

References

Tulsa